While the medieval Angevin Kingdom of Albania was a monarchy, it did not encompass fully the entirety of the modern state of Albania and was ended soon by the Albanian nobles by 1282 when they understood that the Angevin king was not going to keep his promises and thus the Roman Emperor from Constantinople was requested to come. In middle ages in the 14th and 15th centuries three different Albanian nobles called themselves ruler of Albania, including Andrea II Muzaka (Despot of Albania), Karl Thopia (Prince of Albania), and Skanderbeg (Lord of Albania).

The modern Albania has been a kingdom on two occasions.

The first occasion was after the Albanian Declaration of Independence in 1912, though a ruler was not chosen until 1914, and was forced into exile that year when World War I led to the occupation of Albania. The country remained unstable until establishing the Albanian Republic in 1924. The second occasion started in 1928, when the president of the republic declared himself the new monarch. The continuity of the second modern kingdom is distorted by the onset of World War II, occupation by Italy until 1943, then occupation by Nazi Germany until 1944, then civil war until 1946, which ended with the establishment of the People's Republic of Albania. After Albania became the last European nation to embrace the Fall of Communism in 1992, it became a unitary parliamentary constitutional republic, though there continue to be hereditary pretenders to the title of King of the Albanians.

History 
The Albanian Congress of Trieste of 1913 discussed the question of the future prince and several candidates came through: Baron Franz Nopcsa von Felső-Szilvás, Marchese D'Auletta (claiming descendance from Skanderbeg) with the support of the Arbereshe delegates and Italy, Prince Albert Ghica from Romania supported by the Albanian colony there, and Aladro Kastriota.

Under the independence settlement imposed by the Great Powers, the country was styled a principality, and its ruler, William of Wied, was titled prince. However, these styles were only used outside the country. Prince William's full style was: "By the grace of the powers and the will of the people the prince of Albania".

William was forced into exile by internal disorder just after the outbreak of World War I, and Albania was to be occupied by various foreign powers for most of the war. In the confusing aftermath of the war, some of the several regimes competing for power officially styled themselves as regencies for William. Albania's first monarchy ended definitively when the restored central government declared the country a republic in 1924.

Four years later, on September 1, 1928, President Ahmed Bey Zogu proclaimed himself "king of the Albanians" ( in Albanian). Zog sought to establish a constitutional monarchy. Under the royal constitution, the Albanian king, like the king of the Belgians, had to swear an oath before parliament before entering into his royal powers. The text of the oath was as follows:

Zog's kingdom was closely tied to Italy, then ruled by Victor Emmanuel III. On April 7, 1939, Italy occupied Albania, treating it as the Italian protectorate of Albania. Zog fled the country, though he never abdicated, and five days later the Albanian Parliament proclaimed Victor Emmanuel as the new King of the Albanians. When the Italian armed forces started being decimated in 1943, Victor Emmanuel signed the Armistice of Cassibile with the Allies on 3 September 1943, which included his abdication as the Albanian monarch and the end of the so-called protectorate. While Zog I was reinstated as king (in absentia) by pro-monarchy partisans, this action was opposed by pro-communist partisans, all made moot as Nazi Germany immediately commenced the German occupation of Albania. The Germans were pushed out by late 1944, by which point the partisan factions were basically fighting a civil war. This continued until the socialist People's Republic of Albania was established in 1946.

During and after World War II, some Albanians worked for the return of King Zog; however, they were not successful. Neither Zog nor Victor Emmanuel had his Albanian royal title widely acknowledged by the international community. Zog's son, Crown Prince Leka (1939–2011), was the main pretender to the Albanian Crown. As he himself stated, his title was not "king of Albania" but "king of the Albanians", which included a claim to Kosovo and part of today's North Macedonia. Since Crown Prince Leka's death in late November, 2011, the main pretender to the Albanian Throne is his son Leka II.

See also
History of Albania
List of Albanian monarchs
List of Albanian consorts
House of Zogu
Otto Witte, a German circus acrobat who claimed to have been crowned king for a few days.

References

Bibliography
 Patrice Najbor, Histoire de l'Albanie et de sa maison royale (5 volumes), JePublie, Paris, 2008,.
 Patrice Najbor, La dynastye des Zogu, Textes & Prétextes, Paris, 2002

External links 
Maison royale d'Albanie (en Française)
The Albanian Royal Court (in English)

 

it:Re di Albania